Ruben Morán (6 August 1930 in Montevideo – 3 January 1978 in Montevideo) was a Uruguayan footballer, who played for C.A. Cerro.

For the Uruguay national football team, he was part of the 1950 FIFA World Cup winning team, and he played in only one match in the tournament, the decisive match against Brazil that clinched the title for Uruguay. He scored 1 goal in 5 matches.

References
World Cup Champions Squads 1930 - 2002
A primeira grande zebra do Mundial (in Portuguese)

External links

1930 births
1978 deaths
Uruguayan footballers
Uruguay international footballers
1950 FIFA World Cup players
FIFA World Cup-winning players
C.A. Cerro players

Association football forwards